Polk County is a county located in the northwestern part of the U.S. state of Georgia. As of the 2020 census, the population was 42,853. The county seat is Cedartown. The county was created on December 20, 1851, by an act of the Georgia General Assembly and named after James K. Polk, the eleventh President of the United States.

Polk County comprises the Cedartown, GA Metropolitan Statistical Area, which is also included in the Atlanta-Athens-Clarke County-Sandy Springs, GA Combined Statistical Area.

Geography

Most of eastern Polk County, centered on Rockmart, is located in the Etowah River sub-basin of the ACT River Basin (Alabama-Coosa-Tallapoosa River Basin), while most of western Polk County, centered on Cedartown, is located in the Upper Coosa River sub-basin of the same ACT River Basin.  Small slivers of the southern edges of the county are located in the Upper Tallapoosa River sub-basin of the same larger ACT River Basin.

Major highways

  U.S. Route 27
  U.S. Route 27 Business
  U.S. Route 278
  U.S. Route 278 Business
  State Route 1
  State Route 1 Business
  State Route 6
  State Route 6 Business
  State Route 100
  State Route 101
  State Route 113

Adjacent counties
 Floyd County – north
 Bartow County – northeast
 Paulding County – east
 Haralson County – south
 Cleburne County, Alabama – southwest
 Cherokee County, Alabama – west

Demographics

2000 census
As of the census of 2000, there were 38,127 people, 14,012 households, and 10,340 families living in the county. There were 15,059 housing units at an average density of 48 per square mile (19/km2). The racial makeup of the county was 80.52% White, 13.34% Black or African American, 0.22% Native American, 0.31% Asian, 0.04% Pacific Islander, 4.62% from other races, and 0.95% from two or more races.  7.66% of the population were Hispanic or Latino of any race.

There were 14,012 households, out of which 32.90% had children under the age of 18 living with them, 55.90% were married couples living together, 13.10% had a female householder with no husband present, and 26.20% were non-families. 22.70% of all households were made up of individuals, and 10.50% had someone living alone who was 65 years of age or older.  The average household size was 2.66 and the average family size was 3.09.

In the county, the population was spread out, with 26.10% under the age of 18, 9.70% from 18 to 24, 28.80% from 25 to 44, 22.30% from 45 to 64, and 13.20% who were 65 years of age or older.  The median age was 35 years. For every 100 females, there were 99.20 males.  For every 100 women age 18 and over, there were 95.70 men.

The median income for a household in the county was $32,328, and the median income for a family was $37,847. Males had a median income of $29,985 versus $21,452 for females. The per capita income for the county was $15,617.  About 11.20% of families and 15.50% of the population were below the poverty line, including 18.70% of those under age 18 and 12.60% of those age 65 or over.

2010 census
As of the 2010 United States Census, there were 41,475 people, 15,092 households, and 10,908 families living in the county. The racial makeup of the county was 77.1% white, 12.5% black or African American, 0.7% Asian, 0.3% American Indian, 0.1% Pacific islander, 7.5% from other races, and 1.8% from two or more races. Those of Hispanic or Latino origin made up 11.8% of the population. In terms of ancestry, 17.2% were English, 15.2% were American, 13.0% were Irish, and 5.3% were German.

Of the 15,092 households, 38.2% had children under the age of 18 living with them, 51.5% were married couples living together, 14.8% had a female householder with no husband present, 27.7% were non-families, and 23.6% of all households were made up of individuals. The average household size was 2.72 and the average family size was 3.20. The median age was 36.2 years.

The median income for a household in the county was $38,646 and the median income for a family was $43,172. Males had a median income of $37,070 versus $27,758 for females. The per capita income for the county was $18,214. About 15.6% of families and 19.3% of the population were below the poverty line, including 25.4% of those under age 18 and 10.5% of those age 65 or over.

2020 census

As of the 2020 United States census, there were 42,853 people, 15,038 households, and 10,151 families residing in the county.

Recreation 
 Silver Comet Trail

Communities
 Aragon
 Braswell
 Cedartown (county seat)
 Rockmart

Politics

See also

 National Register of Historic Places listings in Polk County, Georgia
List of counties in Georgia

References

External links
 Polk County Historical Society
 Polk County Genealogy 
 Polk County Courthouse – Carl Vinson Institute of Government, University of Georgia
 Polk County Tourism website – Polk on Purpose!

 
Georgia (U.S. state) counties
1851 establishments in Georgia (U.S. state)
Polk
Northwest Georgia (U.S.)
Counties of Appalachia
Populated places established in 1851